The Copernicus Foundation is a 501(c)(3) not for profit organization based in the Jefferson Park neighborhood of Chicago, Illinois.

 It was founded by Poles in Chicago in 1971 in order to raise funds towards raising a monument for the famous  astronomer Nicolaus Copernicus to be set in front of the Adler Planetarium. After the Nicolaus Copernicus Monument's dedication at the 500th anniversary of Copernicus in 1973, the Polish-American community decided to use leftover funds towards the purchase of a cultural and civic center for Chicago's Polonia.

After a thorough search for the permanent site of the Polish Cultural Center in Chicago, ceremonies took place at the old Gateway Theatre building located near Milwaukee and Lawrence avenues in 1979. Because the Gateway Theatre had been the first movie theater in Chicago built exclusively for the "talkies," the Foundation decided to preserve the theater itself while remodeling around it. The "Solidarity Tower," with its matching façade, was erected atop the building which was modified to resemble the historic Royal Castle in Warsaw, Poland. The tower itself was built to resemble the clock tower adorning the Royal Castle.

The activities of the Copernicus Center include:
The Taste of Polonia Festival – an annual event at the Copernicus Center
Mayfest – or Polish fest
January charity event (for children with medical needs)
The Copernican Award
Multi-Cultural Events
Modern Music Events
Community Events
Venue Rentals

The Copernicus Center is also a meeting place for Polish American and other Civic Organization Meetings, the Jefferson Park Chamber of Commerce Activities, the Northwest Chicago Historical Society, CAPS (Chicago Alternative Policing Strategy) Meetings, the DAC (District Advisory Council) Meetings, an Annual Law Fair, Dance Recitals, as well as Public Information and Referral Services

See also
 History of Chicago
 Polish Constitution Day Parade
 Polish National Alliance
 Polish Falcons
 Polish Museum of America
 Polish Cathedral style churches
 Diaspora politics in the United States
 Culture of Chicago

References

External links
 Copernicus Center

Non-profit organizations based in Chicago
Cultural centers in Chicago
Polish-American culture in Chicago
Charities based in Illinois
Polish American
501(c)(3) organizations